Dena Head (born August 16, 1970) is an American retired women's basketball player.  She is best remembered as the first player drafted in the Women's National Basketball Association (WNBA).

High school years
At Salem high school in Canton, Michigan, Head was named Miss Basketball of Michigan.  She won two National Championships and was an All-American. Dena played for Coach Fred Thomann, a former Michigan State University standout.

College years
Head attended the University of Tennessee and earned a degree in sports management. She played four years of basketball, winning the NCAA women's college basketball championship in 1989 and 1991.  Head was named to the 1992 Kodak All-America Team. She was the Southeastern Conference Player of the Year as a senior, and was the 1989 SEC Freshman of the Year. As a senior, she was named to the Naismith All America Team, and in 1990 she was named to the NCAA All Regional Tournament Team East.

She later attended Baker College.

USA Basketball
Head was named to the USA Basketball Women's Junior National Team (now called the U19 team). The team participated in the second Junior World Championship, held in Bilbao, Spain in July 1989. The USA team lost their opening game to South Korea in overtime, then lost a two-point game to Australia. After winning their next game against Bulgaria, the USA team again fell in a close game, losing by three points to Czechoslovakia. After beating Zaire in their next game, the USA team played Spain, and fell three points short. Head averaged 6.9 points per game over the course of the event. The USA team finished in seventh place.

Head played for the USA team, one of sixteen teams at the fifteenth World University Games (1991) held in Sheffield, England. The team was coached by Tara VanDerveer, and teammates included Lisa Leslie and Dawn Staley. The USA team won all eight games it played, earning the gold medal. Head averaged 6.8 points per game over the course of the event.

Head traveled to Taiwan with the team representing the US at the 1992 Women's R. William Jones Cup competition. Head scored 14 points in the opening game against Japan, which the USA team won. The team went on to win all eight games, and earned the gold medal for the event. The fourth game against Australia was a close match, with the Australians holding a slim lead at halftime, but the USA team came back, helped by Head's 18 points to win the game. Head averaged 11 points per game, and recorded 14 assists, second behind Dawn Staley.

Head was named to the USA national team and competed in the 1994 World Championships, held in June 1994 in Sydney, Australia. She competed along with college teammates Daedra Charles and Carla McGhee. The team was coached by Tara VanDerveer, and won their first six games, when they faced Brazil. In a closely contested, high scoring game, Brazil hit ten of ten free throws in the final minute to secure a 110–107 victory. The USA won a close final game against Australia 100–95 to earn the bronze medal.

WNBA career
Head was the first and oldest player drafted in the WNBA. As part of the WNBA Elite draft in 1997, she was selected 1st overall. She joined the WNBA for two seasons with the Utah Starzz and one with the Phoenix Mercury.

WNBA teams
1997–1998: Utah Starzz
2000: Phoenix Mercury

International career
Before the WNBA, Head played seven seasons of professional basketball in Brazil and in Europe for France, Spain, Italy, and Hungary.

Post WNBA career
Head served as women's basketball team assistant coach for the Central Connecticut State University.

Head now works for Amazon as a Manager.

References

External links
 CCSU coach profile

1970 births
Living people
All-American college women's basketball players
American women's basketball players
American expatriate basketball people in France
American expatriate basketball people in Hungary
American expatriate basketball people in Italy
American expatriate basketball people in Spain
American women's basketball coaches
Basketball players from Michigan
Parade High School All-Americans (girls' basketball)
Phoenix Mercury players
Point guards
Tennessee Lady Volunteers basketball players
Universiade gold medalists for the United States
Universiade medalists in basketball
Utah Starzz draft picks
Utah Starzz players
Women's National Basketball Association first-overall draft picks
United States women's national basketball team players